Riverside High School is a public high school located in Williamston, North Carolina.  It was one of two high schools in Martin County Schools that were created by way of consolidation circa 2010. Students formerly served by Jamesville High School and Williamston High School are now served by this school.

References

Public high schools in North Carolina
Schools in Martin County, North Carolina